Tool Academy is a reality TV franchise. It may refer to:

 Tool Academy (U.S. TV series)
 Tool Academy (UK TV series)

Reality television series franchises